The Thimphu Athletics Track and Field Centre is an athletics track in Thimphu, Bhutan. It is the first synthetic athletics track in Bhutan.

History
In 22 February 2012, the Thimphu Athletics Track and Field Centre, the first synthetic athletics track in Bhutan, was inaugurated. Athletics event for both men and women were held as part of the inauguration ceremony. The construction cost US$ 660 thousand and took two years to complete and was funded by the International Amateur Athletics Federation (IAAF), Olympic Council of Asia (OCA), and the International Olympic Committee (IOC).

Facility
The facility hosts a synthetic athletics track which was provided by Italian firm Mondo.

References

Athletics (track and field) venues in Bhutan
Sport in Thimphu
Sports venues completed in 2012
2012 establishments in Bhutan